The 2017–18 England Korfball League season is played with 10 teams. Trojans KC are the defending korfball champions.

Teams
The league will be played with 10 teams. The teams that have finished from 1st to 7th place as of 9 April 2017 in the 2016–17 season qualified for the 2017/18 season. The remaining three places were filled by Cambridge Tigers, Birmingham City and Bearsted who finished in the top three of the Promotion play-offs.

Regular season table

Results

Game-week one

Game-week two

Game-week three

Game-week four

Game-week five

Game-week six

Game-week seven

Game-week eight

Game-week nine

Game-week ten

Game-week eleven

Game-week twelve

Final Stages

Top scorers

Squads
The players listed are those who have appeared at least twice for their club in a league game.

Bearsted

  Head coach: Alexander Sieber

Bec

  Head Coach: John Denton

Birmingham City

  Head Coach: Andy Davies

Cambridge Tigers

  Head Coach: Chris West

Kingfishers

  Head Coach: Johan Oosterling

KV

  Head Coach: Rob Parker

Nomads

  Head Coach: Terry Forde

Norwich Knights

  Head Coach: Joe Stirling

Tornadoes

  Head Coach: Dave Buckland

Trojans

  Head Coach: Gary Brooks

References

England Korfball League
England
England
Korfball
Korfball